Falagountou is a town in and the capital of the Falagountou Department of Séno Province in northern Burkina Faso. The town has a population of 7,969 as of 2003.

References

Populated places in the Sahel Region
Séno Province